The Best of Strawbs is a compilation album of songs by Strawbs, with one track from the Dave Cousins solo album Two Weeks Last Summer.

Track listing

Side one

"Hero and Heroine" (Dave Cousins)
"Tears and Pavan"
"Tears" (Cousins)
"Pavan" (Richard Hudson, John Ford, Cousins)
"A Glimpse of Heaven" (Cousins)
"Round and Round" (Cousins)
"New World" (Cousins)

Side two

"Benedictus" (Cousins)
"Shine on Silver Sun" (Cousins)
"To Be Free" (Cousins)
"Where Do You Go (When You Need a Hole to Crawl In)" (Cousins)
"Autumn"
"Heroine's Theme" (John Hawken)
"Deep Summer's Sleep" (Cousins)
"The Winter Long" (Cousins)

Side three

"Don't Try to Change Me" (Dave Lambert)
"Little Sleepy" (Lambert)
"Part of the Union" (Hudson, Ford)
"Song of a Sad Little Girl" (Cousins)
"Down by the Sea" (Cousins)

Side four

"Lay Down" (Cousins)
"Heavy Disguise" (Ford)
"Lemon Pie" (Cousins)
"Blue Angel" (Cousins)
"Divided"
"Half Worlds Apart"
"At Rest"

Personnel

Dave Cousins – lead vocals, guitar, dulcimer
Tony Hooper - backing vocals, guitar
Dave Lambert – lead vocals, backing vocals, guitar
John Ford – lead vocals, backing vocals, bass guitar, acoustic guitar
Chas Cronk – backing vocals, bass guitar
Blue Weaver – keyboards
John Hawken – keyboards
Richard Hudson - backing vocals, drums, percussion
Rod Coombes – drums
Jon Hiseman – drums

Guest musician 
Roger Glover – bass guitar

Recording history

References
The Best of Strawbs on Strawbsweb

1978 compilation albums
Strawbs compilation albums
A&M Records compilation albums